Pars (Middle Persian: 𐭯𐭠𐭫𐭮𐭩 Pārs) was a Sasanian province in Late Antiquity, which almost corresponded to the present-day province of Fars. The province bordered Khuzestan in the west, Kirman in the east, Spahan in the north, and Mazun in the south.

Name
The Middle Persian name of "Pārs" is derived from Pārsā (𐎱𐎠𐎼𐎿), the Old Persian of the region. The English name Persia and Greek name Persis derives from this region.

Administrative divisions

Ardashir-Khwarrah
Ardashir-Khwarrah (Middle Persian: Arđaxšēr-Xwarra, meaning "glory of Ardashir") was founded by the first Sasanian king Ardashir I (r. 224-242), who made Gor (also founded around the same time) its capital. It was the seat of the driyōšān jādag-gōw ud dādwar (advocate), mowbed (chief priest) and andarzbad (councilor) of Pars.

It formed the southwestern administrative division of Pars, and consisted of a mountainous countryside of the southern Zagros Mountains—much of the territory inhabited later by the Qashqai tribe; with its mountainous terrain and extreme temperature, this was regarded by the geographers as a "sardsīr" (cold zone). The Zagros mountains and the coastal plain, along the Persian Gulf, however, was regarded by the geographers as a garmsīr (hot zone). In the center of the circular city of Gor, there was a tower-like structure called Terbal, which was similar to a Buddhist stupa. Furthermore, there was also a fire-temple which the 10th-century Arab historian al-Masudi reportedly visited.

Istakhr
Istakhr (Middle Persian: Staxr) served as an administrative and religious centre under the Sasanian Empire, which it had done since Achaemenid times. The Anahid fire-temple was the "ideological heart of the empire." It was also the home town of the Sasanians.

Darabgerd
Darabgerd (Middle Persian: Dārāvkirt, meaning "Darab did it") was a town founded during the Parthian era, and was turned into an administrative division by Ardashir I after he took conquered it.

Shapur-Khwarrah
Shapur-Khwarrah (Middle Persian: Šāpuhr-Xwarra, meaning "glory of Shapur") was founded by the second Sasanian king Shapur I (r. 240-270).

Arrajan (Veh-az-Amid-Kavadh)
Arrajan (Middle Persian: Argān), also known as Veh-az-Amid-Kavadh, was a late administrative division founded in the early 6th century by Kavadh I (r. 498–531), who attached a small part of Khuzestan to it and settled prisoners of war from Amid and Martyropolis in the place.

History

Establishment

Ardashir I's conquest of Pars started from the early 200s and ended in ca. 223; the province was originally divided between several local rulers, who were vassals of the Parthian Empire. Ardashir's conquest began when he succeeded Tiri as the argbed (fortress commander) of the castle of Darabgerd. From there he marched to the nearby place of Gobanan, where he killed its king, Pasin. He thereafter marched to a place named Konus and killed its king, Manuchihr. He then invaded Lurwir and killed its king, Dara. In ca. 205/6, Ardashir urged his father Papak to revolt and kill Gochihr, the powerful ruler of Istakhr; Papak successfully managed to do that, but appointed his other son Shapur as his heir, which enraged Ardashir and made him fortify himself in another place in Pars, where he later founded Gor.

Papak died a few years later, which gave Ardashir the opportunity to rebel against Shapur, who died in 211/2 after an accident. Ardashir spent the rest of the following years fighting other local rulers of Pars and its surroundings, such as the Parthian dynast Mihrak, who ruled Abarsas and Jahrom. By 223, Ardashir was the undisputed king of Pars, and the following year defeated and killed the last Parthian king, Artabanus V.

Early history
During the childhood of Shapur II (r. 309–379), Arab nomads made several incursions into Pars, where they raided Gor and its surroundings.

Late history
In the early 5th century, a bridge was built in Gor by the Sasanian minister (wuzurg framadār) Mihr Narseh, who was a native of Abruwan, a subdistrict in Ardashir-Khwarrah. An inscription was also written on the bridge, which says; "This bridge was built by order of Mihr-Narseh, wuzurg framadār, for his soul's sake and at his own expense... Whoever has come on this road let him give a blessing to Mihr-Narseh and his sons for that he thus bridged this crossing." Furthermore, he also founded four villages with a fire-temple in each of them. The name of the fire-temples were; Faraz-mara-awar-khwadaya, Zurwandadan, Kardadan, and Mahgushnaspan. He had a fifth fire-temple constructed in Abruwan, which may have been the Barin fire-temple that the 10th-century Persian geographer Estakhri visited, who stated that the fire-temple had an inscription that stated 30,000 dirhams was spent for its construction. Sometime before 540, a diocese was established in Gor.

Muslim conquest

First Muslim invasion and the successful Sasanian counter-attack
The Muslim invasion of Pars first began in 638/9, when the Rashidun governor of Bahrain, al-'Ala' ibn al-Hadrami, who after having defeated some rebellious Arab tribes, seized an island in the Persian Gulf. Although al-'Ala' and the rest of the Arabs had been ordered to not invade Pars or its surrounding islands, he and his men continued their raids into the province. Al-'Ala quickly prepared an army which was divided into three groups, one under al-Jarud ibn Mu'alla, the second under al-Sawwar ibn Hammam and the third under Khulayd ibn al-Mundhir ibn Sawa. When the first group entered Pars, it was quickly defeated and al-Jarud was killed.

The same thing soon happened to the second group. However, things proved to be more fortunate with the third group; Khulayd managed to keep them on bay, but was unable to withdraw back to Bahrain due to the Sasanians blocking his way at the sea. Umar, founding out about al-'Ala's invasion of Pars, had him replaced with Sa'd ibn Abi Waqqas as the governor of Bahrain. Umar then ordered Utbah ibn Ghazwan to send reinforcements to Khulayd. When the reinforcements arrived, Khulayd and some of his men managed successfully to withdraw back to Bahrain, while the rest withdrew to Basra.

Second and last Muslim invasion
In ca. 643, Uthman ibn Abi al-As seized Bishapur, and made a peace treaty with the inhabitants of the city.
In 19/644, al-'Ala' once again attacked Pars from Bahrain, reaching as far as  Istakhr, until he was repelled by the governor (marzban) of Pars, Shahrag. Some time later, Uthman ibn Abi al-As managed to establish a military base at Tawwaj, and shortly defeated and killed Shahrag near Rew-shahr (however other sources states that it was his brother who did it). A Persian convert to Islam, Hormoz ibn Hayyan al-'Abdi, was shortly sent by Uthman ibn Abi al-'As to attack a fortress known as Senez on the coast of Pars. After the accession of Uthman ibn Affan as the new Caliph of the Rashidun Caliphate on 11 November, the inhabitants of Bishapur under the leadership of Shahrag's brother declared independence, but were defeated. However the date for this revolt mains disputed, as the Persian historian al-Baladhuri states that it occurred in 646.

In 648, 'Abd-Allah ibn al-'Ash'ari forced the governor of Istakhr, Mahak, to surrender the city. However, this was not the final conquest of Istakhr, as the inhabitants of the city would later rebel in 649/50 while its newly appointed governor, 'Abd-Allah ibn 'Amir was trying to capture Gor. The military governor of the province, 'Ubayd Allah ibn Ma'mar, was defeated and killed. In 650/1, the Sasanian emperor Yazdegerd III went to Istakhr and tried to plan an organized resistance against the Arabs, and after some time he went to Gor, but Istakhr failed to put up a strong resistance, and was soon sacked by the Arabs, who killed over 40,000 defenders. The Arabs then quickly seized Gor, Kazerun and Siraf, while Yazdegerd III fled to Kirman. Thus ended the Muslim conquest of Pars, however, the inhabitants of the province would later several times rebel against the Arabs.

Religion

The majority of Pars' inhabitants were Zoroastrians, which is confirmed by the linguistic and historical evidence found in the region, such as the burial practices found in the region and "that the Avesta was canonized on the basis of the tradition of Pars." A large Christian community also lived in Pars, due to the large deportation of inhabitants from the Roman Empire by Shapur I to the province.

Trade importance

See also
 Fars Province
 Persis

References

Sources

Further reading
 

Provinces of the Sasanian Empire
History of Fars Province
224 establishments
States and territories established in the 220s
651 disestablishments